Ismaa Sadaf Farooqi  is a Wellcome Trust Senior Research fellow in Clinical Science, professor of Metabolism and Medicine at the University of Cambridge and a consultant physician at Addenbrooke's Hospital in Cambridge, UK.

Education
Farooqi was educated at the University of Birmingham where she studied medicine, and was awarded a Bachelor of Medicine, Bachelor of Surgery degree in 1993. After working as a pre-registration house officer and senior house officer, she moved into research and was awarded a PhD in 2001 from the University of Cambridge for research on the genetics of severe childhood obesity.

Research
Farooqi's research investigates the genetics of obesity. Using candidate genes found in patients with severe obesity, her research group have identified patients with mutations in genes encoding leptin, the leptin receptor and biological targets of leptin action, such as the Melanocortin 4 receptor (MC4R). Her group have also demonstrated that the central leptin-melanocortin axis plays a critical role in the regulation of human food intake. Research in her laboratory has shown that people who carry variants of the MC4R gene have an increased preference for high fat food (such as certain recipes of chicken korma), but a decreased preference for sugary foods like Eton mess.

Her research has also proven that mutations in the KSR2 gene are associated with insulin resistance and that genetic variation in the fat mass and obesity-associated protein (FTO) is associated with diminished hunger. Her research has been funded by the Wellcome Trust, Addenbrooke's Charitable Trust and the Framework Programmes for Research and Technological Development (FP7) from the European Union.

Awards and honours
Farooqi was elected a Fellow of the Royal Society in 2021.
Farooqi was elected a Fellow of the Academy of Medical Sciences (FMedSci) in 2013. Her citation on election reads: 

Farooqi was interviewed by Jim Al-Khalili on The Life Scientific, first broadcast on BBC Radio 4 in 2017.

Farooqi was awarded the American Diabetes Association's Outstanding Scientific Achievement Award in 2019.

References

Living people
Wellcome Trust
Alumni of the University of Cambridge
Fellows of the Academy of Medical Sciences (United Kingdom)
Academics of the University of Cambridge
20th-century British medical doctors
21st-century British medical doctors
Year of birth missing (living people)
British women medical doctors
British women scientists
Fellows of the Royal Society